Viking chess may refer to:

 Kubb (Stickey Sticks in Britain) a lawn game that is akin to horseshoes and lawn bowl, knocking down wickets with thrown sticks 
 Hnefatafl (Throw Board in Medieval Britain), a board game unrelated to the "chess" family, that was supplanted by western chess.

See also
 Viking (disambiguation)
 Chess (disambiguation)